Do You Like Rock Music? is the third album from the Brighton-based English band, Sea Power, then known as British Sea Power. It was released on 14 January 2008 in the UK and 12 February 2008 in the United States. The album is preceded by the Krankenhaus? EP, released on digital download on 8 October 2007.

It entered the UK Albums Chart at number 10 and the Irish Albums Chart at number 37.

Reception

It is one of the few albums to not receive an actual numerical review from Pitchfork, instead initially receiving a rating of "U.2", with a middling review citing its ambitious nature while stating "Do You Like Rock Music? doesn't fail miserably... but disappoints gently." After a change to their site layout and rating presentation, that rating now appears as 8.2, though the review itself has not changed.

Track listing

Personnel
Sea Power
 Jan Scott Wilkinson ("Yan") – vocals, guitar
 Martin Noble ("Noble") – guitar
 Neil Hamilton Wilkinson ("Hamilton") – bass, vocals, guitar
 Matthew Wood ("Wood") – drums

Additional musicians
 Abi Fry – viola, string arrangements
 Becky Foon – cello, string arrangements, choir (tracks 1 and 12)
 Eamon Hamilton – harmonium
 Phil Sumner – cornet
 Graham Sutton – additional keys and programming
 Basia Bulat – choir (tracks 1 and 12)
 Bobby Bulat – choir (tracks 1 and 12)
 Holly Rancher – choir (tracks 1 and 12)
 Howard Bilerman – choir (tracks 1 and 12)
 Jo Israel – choir (tracks 1 and 12)
 Laura Kennison – choir (track 4)
 Lisa Lindley-Jones – choir (track 4)
 Vicky Oag – choir (track 4)
 BSP – string arrangements

Technical personnel
 Graham Sutton – mixing (except track 12), production
 BSP – recording (tracks 4, 9, 10), production, packaging and photos
 Howard Bilerman – recording (except tracks 4, 9 and 10)
 Efrim Menuck – recording (except tracks 4, 9 and 10)
 Jan Scott Wilkinson ("Yan") – mixing (track 12)
 Milos Hajicek – assistant engineering
 Laurence Aldridge – assistant engineering
 Luke Joyse – assistant engineering
 Tim Young – mastering
 Stuart Hawkes – mastering
 Matthew Wood ("Wood") – packaging and photos
 Alison Fielding – packaging and photos
 David Taylor – packaging and photos
 The Outlying Station – sleeve notes

Chart performance

Release history

References

British Sea Power albums
2008 albums
Rough Trade Records albums